José Daniel Mulato Palacios (born 9 January 2003) is a Colombian footballer who currently plays as a forward for FC Dallas.

Club career
Born in Cali, Colombia, Mulato started his career with Deportivo Cali, making his debut in January 2020. In mid-2021, he was invited to train with German champions Bayern Munich, as part of their "World Squad" programme. Following this, he was signed by Bayern Munich affiliate, and American side FC Dallas' reserve team, North Texas SC on loan for the 2022 season. On 18 November 2022, he signed a permanent deal with FC Dallas.

Career statistics

Club

Notes

References

2003 births
Living people
Footballers from Cali
Colombian footballers
Colombia youth international footballers
Association football forwards
Deportivo Cali footballers
North Texas SC players
FC Dallas players
Categoría Primera A players
Colombian expatriate footballers
Colombian expatriate sportspeople in the United States
Expatriate soccer players in the United States
MLS Next Pro players